Spring Park is a small city nestled on the shores of Lake Minnetonka in Hennepin County, Minnesota, United States and is about 20 miles west of Minneapolis. The population was 1,669 at the 2010 census. 

The small town is rich in history. What is now Spring Park was once the grounds of Hotel Del Otero, a summer lake resort built by James J. Hill.

It was incorporated in 1951 and at that time had a population of a little over 200.

Geography

County 15 and County 51 are two of the main routes.

Demographics

2010 census
As of the census of 2010, there were 1,669 people, 897 households, and 314 families living in the city. The racial makeup of the city was 94.1% White, 2.0% African American, 0.1% Native American, 2.6% Asian, 0.2% from other races, and 1.0% from two or more races. Hispanic or Latino of any race were 1.4% of the population.

There were 897 households, of which 15.3% had children under the age of 18 living with them, 24.7% were married couples living together, 6.6% had a female householder with no husband present, 3.7% had a male householder with no wife present, and 65.0% were non-families. 55.0% of all households were made up of individuals, and 22.9% had someone living alone who was 65 years of age or older. The average household size was 1.67 and the average family size was 2.52.

The median age in the city was 49.2 years. 13.1% of residents were under the age of 18; 5.1% were between the ages of 18 and 24; 25.8% were from 25 to 44; 25.8% were from 45 to 64; and 30.1% were 65 years of age or older. The gender makeup of the city was 46.4% male and 53.6% female.

2000 census
As of the census of 2000, there were 1,717 people, 930 households, and 321 families living in the city. The racial makeup of the city was 96.51% White, 1.40% African American, 0.35% Native American, 0.70% Asian, 0.23% from other races, and 0.82% from two or more races. Hispanic or Latino of any race were 0.82% of the population.

There were 930 households, out of which 11.3% had children under the age of 18 living with them, 26.3% were married couples living together, 4.6% had a female householder with no husband present, and 65.4% were non-families. 55.1% of all households were made up of individuals, and 22.5% had someone living alone who was 65 years of age or older.  The average household size was 1.63 and the average family size was 2.43.

In the city, the population was spread out, with 9.3% under the age of 18, 8.3% from 18 to 24, 30.3% from 25 to 44, 20.2% from 45 to 64, and 31.9% who were 65 years of age or older.  The median age was 47 years. For every 100 females, there were 87.9 males.  For every 100 females age 18 and over, there were 85.0 males.

The median income for a household in the city was $36,071, and the median income for a family was $42,969. Males had a median income of $40,750 versus $33,750 for females. The per capita income for the city was $30,290.  About 8.0% of families and 8.8% of the population were below the poverty line, including 17.9% of those under age 18 and 6.5% of those age 65 or over.

Economy
Tonka Toys was headquartered in Spring Park between 1946 and 1991.

References

External links
City website

Cities in Hennepin County, Minnesota
Cities in Minnesota
Populated places established in 1951
1951 establishments in Minnesota